Vladimir Stanislavovich Merovshchikov (born 13 January 1956) is a Russian professional football coach and a former player currently working as an assistant manager with FC Sheksna Cherepovets.

External links
 Career summary by KLISF

1956 births
Living people
Soviet footballers
Soviet expatriate footballers
Expatriate footballers in Poland
Russian footballers
FC Fakel Voronezh players
FC Spartak Tambov players
Russian football managers
Russian expatriates in Poland
Association football goalkeepers
FC Dynamo Vologda players